Bhim Bahadur Tamang (Nepali:भीमबहादुर तामाङ) (1933 – December 1, 2012) was a former freedom fighter (1949) and former Minister of Law of Nepal (1996-1997). He ran for President of the Nepali Congress Party along with Sher Bahadur Deuba and Sushil Koirala in 2010, but only garnered 78 votes.

References

1933 births
2012 deaths
Nepalese Buddhists
Nepali Congress politicians from Bagmati Province
Tamang people
Nepal MPs 1994–1999